Syntrophobacter wolinii is a species of bacteria notable for degrading propionate. It is non-motile, gram-negative and rod-shaped.

References

Further reading
Harmsen, Hermie JM, et al. "Phylogenetic analysis of Syntrophobacter wolinii reveals a relationship with sulfate-reducing bacteria." Archives of Microbiology160.3 (1993): 238–240.
Wallrabenstein, Christina, Elisabeth Hauschild, and Bernhard Schink. "Pure culture and cytological properties of ‘ Syntriphobacter wolini’." FEMS Microbiology Letters 123.3 (1994): 249–254.

External links
 J.P. Euzéby: List of Prokaryotic names with Standing in Nomenclature

Type strain of Syntrophobacter wolinii at BacDive -  the Bacterial Diversity Metadatabase

Thermodesulfobacteriota
Bacteria described in 1980